Shihori Railway Station is a Banaskantha, Gujarat, India on the Western line of the Western railway network.
Shihori Railway Station is 33 km far away from Patan railway station, One Passenger, two Express, and two Superfast trains halt here.

Nearby Stations

Major Trains

References 

Railway stations in Banaskantha district
Ahmedabad railway division
Railway junction stations in Gujarat